The Anterolateral sulcus of spinal cord is a landmark on the anterior side of the spinal cord. It denotes the location at which the ventral fibers leave the spinal cord.

The anterolateral sulcus is less visible than the posterolateral sulcus.

See also
 Anterolateral sulcus of medulla

References

Spinal cord